Stoyan Stamenov (born 17 April 1970) is a Bulgarian sports shooter. He competed in the men's 10 metre air rifle event at the 1992 Summer Olympics.

References

External links
 

1970 births
Living people
Bulgarian male sport shooters
Olympic shooters of Bulgaria
Shooters at the 1992 Summer Olympics
Sportspeople from Sofia
20th-century Bulgarian people